Sufism known as Tasawwuf in the Arabic-speaking world, is a form of Islamic mysticism that emphasizes introspection and spiritual closeness with the God. It is a mystical form of Islam, a school of practice that emphasizes the inward search for The God and shuns materialism. About 60% Muslims in Pakistan regard themselves as followers of Sufi saints.

Sufi traditions 
Most of the Sufis in Pakistan relate to the four main tariqa (silsila): Chishti, Naqshbandi, Qadiri-Razzaqi and Suhrawardi.

Contemporary influence 
There are two levels of Sufism in Pakistan. The first is the 'populist' Sufism of the rural population. This level of Sufism involves belief in intercession through saints, veneration of their shrines and forming bonds with a pir (saint). Many rural Pakistani Muslims associate with pirs and seek their intercession. The second level of Sufism in Pakistan is 'intellectual Sufism' which is growing among the urban and educated population. They are influenced by the writings of Sufis such as the medieval theologian al-Ghazali, the Sufi reformer Shaykh Aḥmad Sirhindi and Shah Wali Allah.

Attacks on Sufi shrines
Sufism, a mystical Islamic tradition, has a long history and a large popular following in Pakistan. Popular Sufi culture is centred on Thursday night gatherings at shrines and annual festivals which feature Sufi music and dance.  Most Islamic fundamentalists criticise its popular character, which in their view, does not accurately reflect the teachings and practice of the Prophet and his companions.

Since March 2005, 209 people have been killed and 560 injured in 29 different terrorist attacks targeting shrines devoted to Sufi saints in Pakistan, according to data compiled by the Center for Islamic Research Collaboration and Learning (CIRCLe). The attacks are generally attributed to banned militant organisations.

The Sehwan Sharif shrine was the site of a suicide bombing in 2017 carried out by the Islamic State.

See also
 Islam in Pakistan
 Sufism in Sindh
List of Sufi saints
Shadhiliyya
 Kubrawiyyah

References

Bibliography
 De Bruijn, The Qalandariyyat in Persian Mystical Poetry from Sana'i, in The Heritage of Sufism, 2003. 
 Ashk Dahlén, The Holy Fool in Medieval Islam: The Qalandariyat of Fakhr al-din Araqi, Orientalia Suecana, vol.52, 2004.
 Chopra, R. M., "Great Sufi Poets of the Punjab", 1999, Iran Society, Calcutta.
 Chopra, R. M., "SUFISM" (Origin, Growth, Eclipse, Resurgence), 2016, Anuradha Prakashan, New Delhi, .

External links
 The Islam That Hard-Liners Hate
 Pakistan's Sufis Preach Faith and Ecstasy
 Sufism in Pakistan – the tolerant antidote?
 Mystical Islam 'under threat' in Pakistan
 Steeped in ancient mysticism, the passion of Pakistani Sufis infuriates Taliban
 The Sufis of India and Pakistan
 Sufism and Pakistani society
 Why are they targeting the Sufis?
 /Sufism-in-Punjab/Sufis faced threatening from punjabi Taliban in Punjab 
 Difficulties faced by Sufism in Pakistan